The 1821 New England tornado outbreak was a tornado outbreak that affected the New England states during September 1821.  Five destructive tornadoes can be verified from the event.

The first known storm of the outbreak touched down in Washington County, Vermont, and caused tree damage near the town of Berlin.  Shortly thereafter, tornadoes touched down in Grafton County, New Hampshire, and a series of large tornadoes tracked through parts of Rutland County, Vermont, and Sullivan and Merrimack counties in New Hampshire.  Other tornadoes struck in Windham County, Vermont, and Franklin County, Massachusetts.

Known tornadoes

See also
List of North American tornadoes and tornado outbreaks

References

External links
 http://docs.lib.noaa.gov/rescue/mwr/064/mwr-064-04-0156.pdf

Tornado
Tornado
Tornadoes in Massachusetts
Tornadoes in New Hampshire
Tornadoes in Vermont
Tornado
Tornado 1821-09
Tornadoes of 1821